Edward Dean Cooke (October 17, 1849 – June 24, 1897) was a U.S. Representative from Illinois.

Born in Cascade, Iowa, Cooke attended the common schools, the local academy, and the high school at Dubuque. He studied law at Dubuque and in the law department of Columbian University (now George Washington University), Washington, D.C., and was graduated from that institution in 1873. He was admitted to the bar in the same year and commenced practice in Chicago, Illinois. He served as member of the State house of representatives in 1883.

Cooke was elected as a Republican to the Fifty-fourth and Fifty-fifth Congresses and served from March 4, 1895, until his death in Washington, D.C., June 24, 1897. He was interred in Rosehill Cemetery, Chicago, Illinois.

See also
List of United States Congress members who died in office (1790–1899)

References

1849 births
1897 deaths
Burials at Rosehill Cemetery
Politicians from Chicago
Republican Party members of the United States House of Representatives from Illinois
Republican Party members of the Illinois House of Representatives
People from Cascade, Iowa
19th-century American politicians